Jho is a surname of the following people:
 Andile Jho (born 1992), South African rugby union player
 Jho Low (Low Taek Jho), Malaysian businessman
Kim Jho Gwangsoo, is a South Korean film director, screenwriter, film producer and LGBT rights activist
Somila Jho (born 1995), South African rugby union player